The Technics SL-10 is a direct-drive, linear tracking automatic turntable, which was produced from 1979 to 1985.

Features

The SL-10 was the first linear-tracking turntable to feature direct drive, a Technics innovation dating back to 1969 with the SP-10 Mk I. The SL-10, along with its fully programmable stablemate the SL-15, was able to penetrate the consumer electronics market much more effectively than any preceding linear-tracking turntable, and it spawned a wave of imitators throughout the 1980s, along with many derivations by Technics itself.

Unlike many of the inexpensive designs that followed it, the SL-10 is cast from aluminum and weighs 6.5 kg (14 lb). Its chassis is the same size as a standard LP jacket, doing away with the large plinth, visible tonearm and general bulk associated with conventional radial-tracking turntables that the public was familiar with up to that point.

The SL-10 came equipped with the Technics EPS-310MC moving-coil cartridge. Due to the low output of the moving-coil cartridge, the SL-10 includes a built-in, bypassable step-up preamp to allow it to connect to standard phono inputs. The original Technics EPS-310MC moving-coil cartridge was designed to be replaced as a unit; the stylus was not removable. The cartridge has since been discontinued; the SL-10 will accept any P-mount/T4P cartridge. The SL-10 is capable of being powered by an external DC power adapter or a standard AC power supply. The motor is quartz-locked, providing accurate rotational speed.

Perhaps the SL-10's most unusual feature is its ability to play records in any position, even in a vertical position, in fact records could be played upside down with the lid closed, the SL-10's internal disc clamp holds the record in place, and the tonearm, being dynamically balanced, maintains a consistent tracking force regardless of the turntable position.

An example of the SL-10 was in the collection of the Museum of Modern Art.

Specifications

Platter Type: 300mm (11¾") diameter die-cast aluminium
Speed Accuracy: +/- 0.002%
Wow and Flutter: 0.025%
Rumble: -78 dB
Tonearm Type: Dynamic balanced linear tracking gimbal suspension
Effective Tonearm Length: 105mm (4¼")
Original Cartridge: EPC-310MC
Cartridge Frequency Response: 10 to 60,000 Hz
Dimensions: 315 x 88 x 315mm (12½" x 3½" x 12½")
Weight: 6.5kg (14 lb)

Notes

References
 SL10 page on Technics Museum site

1981 musical instruments
Turntables
DJ equipment
Electronic musical instruments
Japanese inventions
Musical instruments invented in the 1980s
Panasonic products
Turntablism